Law enforcement in New York City is carried out by numerous Federal, State, City and Private agencies. New York City has the highest concentration of Law Enforcement in the United States.

Federal government agencies

 Bureau of Alcohol, Tobacco, Firearms and Explosives
 Amtrak Police Department
 Department of Defense Police
 Diplomatic Security Service
 Drug Enforcement Administration
 Federal Air Marshal Service
 Federal Bureau of Investigation
 Federal Bureau of Prisons
 Federal Reserve Police
 Immigration and Customs Enforcement
 IRS Criminal Investigation Division
 National Park Service Ranger (Law Enforcement)
 Naval Criminal Investigative Service
 Smithsonian Police (for the George Gustav Heye Center and the Cooper Hewitt, Smithsonian Design Museum)
 U.S. Army Criminal Investigation Command
 United States Coast Guard
 U.S. Customs and Border Protection
 United States Federal Protective Service
 U.S. Fish and Wildlife Service
 United States Marshals Service
 U.S. Marshals Service Southern District of New York
 U.S. Marshals Service Eastern District of New York 
 United States Park Police
 United States Postal Inspection Service
 United States Postal Police
 U.S. Probation and Pretrial Services System
 United States Secret Service
 United States Department of Veterans Affairs Police

State government agencies
The Government of New York State operates one of the highest numbers of law enforcement agencies in the United States. While their jurisdiction stretches throughout New York City, many functions are duplicated by municipal agencies.

 New York State Office of the Attorney General – Investigations Division
 Metropolitan Transportation Authority Police Department
 MTA Bridge and Tunnel Officers
 New York State Department of Corrections and Community Supervision
 New York State Court Officers
 New York State Department of Environmental Conservation Police
 New York State Forest Rangers
 New York State Office of Mental Health Police
 New York State Office for People With Developmental Disabilities Police
 New York State Department of Motor Vehicles – Division of Field Investigations
 New York State Park Police
 New York State Police
 New York State University Police
 New York State Department of Taxation and Finance
 Criminal Investigations Division
 New York State Office of Tax Enforcement

Bi-state agencies
These agencies work in both New York State and New Jersey and have jurisdiction in both states.

List of Agencies

City government agencies

Powers and Authority
Members of New York city law enforcement agencies receive their powers and authority from New York State Criminal Procedure Law as listed:
 Police Officers who are listed under Article 2, §1.20 section 34 (A through V)
 Peace Officers who are listed under Article 2, §2.10 (1 through 85) and Special Patrolmen under Article 2, §2.10, sub 27

Designation as a special patrolman is unique to New York City, and is granted by the Commissioner of the NYPD under section 14-106 of the New York City Administrative Code in conjunction with the New York State Criminal Procedure Law Article 2 Section 2.10 Sub 27. The exercise of these powers is limited to the employee's geographical area of employment and only while such employee is actually on duty as listed in Chapter 13 subsection (C): Special Patrolman,</ref>. New York City Special Patrolman are appointed in connection with special duties of employment, and such designation confers limited Peace Officer powers upon the employee as listed in Chapter 13 subsection (C).

List of Agencies

Since 1942, correction and probation services have been handled by separate agencies, not the sheriff's office.

The New York City Marshals, who are independent public officers enforcing civil debt, are not peace officers. New York City Marshals are regulated by the New York City Department of Investigation.

Private agencies 
A number of private communities own and operate their own public safety agencies. A few selected personnel are New York state peace officers, after completing a basic peace officer training course. This grants them limited law enforcement authority within their geographical area of employment in New York City.

Privately owned and operated Public Safety Officers must complete the New York State POST (Peace Officer Standard of Training) to become certified.

The Times Square Alliance has its own Public Safety Officers (PSOs) who act as the 'eyes and ears' for the local police. They are unarmed and their motto is: New York's Most Helpful.
The Flatiron 23rd Street Partnership BID' has its own Public Safety Officers'' who act as ambassadors for the area. They patrol in uniform, during the daytime, seven days a week, regardless of weather.

Prosecuting attorneys 
In New York State, each county has an elected district attorney who is responsible for the prosecution of violations of New York state laws. 
Federal law in the city of New York is prosecuted by the U.S. Attorney for the Southern District of New York or the United States Attorney for the Eastern District of New York.

Disbanded agencies 

 Central Park Police
 ASPCA Humane Law Enforcement Division
 New York City Park Police
 New York Cross Harbor Railroad Police
 New York City Telegraph Bureau
 Defunct Agencies from the Bronx
 Bronx County Safety Patrol
 Kingsbridge Town Police Department
 Town of Morrisania Police Department
 West Farms Town Police Department
 Defunct Agencies from Brooklyn 
 Brooklyn Police Department
 Brooklyn Bridge Police
 Brooklyn Town Police Department
 Bushwick Town Police Department
 Flatbush Town Police Department
 Flatlands Town Police Department
 New Utrecht Town Police Department
 Defunct Agencies from Queens 
 Flushing Town Police Department
 Long Island City Police Department
 Jamaica Town Police Department
 Merged into the Metropolitan Transportation Authority Police
 Long Island Rail Road Police Department
 Metro-North Railroad Police Department
 Staten Island Rapid Transit Authority Police Department
 Merged into the New York City Police Department:
 New York City Housing Authority Police Department
 New York City Board of Education Division of School Safety (See New York City Police Department School Safety Division)
 New York City Transit Authority Police Department
 Merged into the New York City Sheriff's Office
 Bronx County Sheriff’s Office
 Kings County Sheriff's Office
 New York County Sheriff’s Office
 Queens County Sheriff’s Office
 Richmond County Sheriff’s Office
 Succeeded by the New York City Department of Environmental Protection Police 
 New York City Bureau of Water Supply Police

See also

 Crime in New York City
 List of law enforcement agencies in New York
 Mary Shanley, 4th female detective
 New York City Police Department Auxiliary Police

References

 
Law enforcement in New York City